"China Grove" is a song by American rock band the Doobie Brothers, released in 1973 for their third studio album The Captain and Me. It was written and sung by original lead singer/songwriter Tom Johnston. The song reached number 15 on the Billboard Hot 100.  While there is a real China Grove, Texas, a real China Grove, North Carolina and a real China Grove, Alabama, Johnston's lyrics about the community are fictional. The song spent eight weeks in the Top 40.

Composition and recording
In 2010, examination of the master recording tape for the track by recording engineer Chris Baseford revealed that, similar to most bands of the time, the band played together while tracking in the studio instead of overdubbing the instrumental elements.

The production on the song was described as "pretty standard". Aside from the drums, panned slightly off center, additional percussion like a tambourine and hand clapping overdubs were added. Baseford described the bass performance and sound on this song as "top notch" with Tiran Porter playing the melodic line using a pick and plugging directly into the mixing board.

The song uses the Latin clave rhythm.

Origins
Like many songs by Johnston, the music was composed and developed before the lyrics were written. It started with a guitar riff that he and drummer John Hartman developed into a jam with a chord structure. Johnston said that the lyrics were influenced by a piano part in the performance.  According to Johnston, "...I really owe Billy Payne for the words because he played this wacky bridge that started the thinking process with this wacky sheriff, samurai swords, and all that."

The song is based on a real small town in Texas. Johnston thought he had created a fictional town called "China Grove" near San Antonio and later learned it really exists from his cab driver in Houston. Johnston later explained that the band had been on tour passing through the town of China Grove on the way to or from San Antonio, and he had seen a road sign with the name, but somehow had forgotten about it.

Reception
Ultimate Classic Rock critic Michael Gallucci rated "China Grove" as the Doobie Brothers' 5th greatest song, praising the guitar riffs and calling it "the group's toughest-sounding song."  The staff of Billboard rated it as the Doobie Brothers' 4th best song, saying that the guitar riffs that begin the song are " the stuff of air guitar legend," and stating that "the 'sleepy little town' comes alive in clear detail."

Personnel 
The Doobie Brothers:

 Tom Johnston – electric guitar, lead guitar, lead and backing vocals
 Patrick Simmons – electric guitar, backing vocals
 Tiran Porter – bass, backing vocals
 John Hartman – drums, percussion, backing vocals
 Michael Hossack – drums

Additional players:

 Bill Payne – piano

Chart performance

Weekly charts

Year-end charts

References

External links
  (original studio version)
  - from Rockin' down the Highway: The Wildlife Concert (1996)

1973 singles
The Doobie Brothers songs
Songs about Texas
Songs written by Tom Johnston (musician)
Song recordings produced by Ted Templeman
Warner Records singles